Dennis Nieblas Moreno (born 16 October 1990) is a Spanish professional footballer who plays as a defender.

Club career
Born in Terrassa, Barcelona, Catalonia, Nieblas was a CE Europa youth graduate. After making his debuts as a senior with CF Olesa, he subsequently represented CE Manresa and CD Masnou, all of them in the regional leagues.

On 1 July 2013 Nieblas moved abroad, signing a one-year contract with Portuguese Segunda Liga side C.D. Trofense. He made his professional debut on 17 August, coming on as a late substitute for Mateus Fonseca in a 1–2 away loss against FC Porto B.

In August 2014, after being named the best defender of the league, Nieblas joined Othellos Athienou F.C. in Cyprus. After being sparingly used he switched teams and countries again, signing for Jordanian side Shabab Al Ordon and joining fellow Spaniards Toni Espinosa and José Pedrosa Galán.

On 1 September 2015 Nieblas returned to his home country, after agreeing to a contract with Segunda División B side CD Guadalajara.

On 30 January 2019, Nieblas joined CD Toledo.

References

External links

1990 births
Living people
Footballers from Terrassa
Spanish footballers
Association football defenders
Segunda División B players
CE Manresa players
CD Guadalajara (Spain) footballers
Real Balompédica Linense footballers
Liga Portugal 2 players
C.D. Trofense players
Cypriot First Division players
Othellos Athienou F.C. players
Shabab Al-Ordon Club players
Austrian Football Bundesliga players
Kapfenberger SV players
Víkingur Gøta players
CD Toledo players
Faroe Islands Premier League players
Ecuadorian Serie A players
Spanish expatriate footballers
Spanish expatriate sportspeople in Portugal
Spanish expatriate sportspeople in Cyprus
Spanish expatriate sportspeople in Austria
Spanish expatriate sportspeople in Ecuador
Expatriate footballers in Portugal
Expatriate footballers in Cyprus
Expatriate footballers in Jordan
Expatriate footballers in Austria
Expatriate footballers in Ecuador
Expatriate footballers in the Faroe Islands
CD Masnou players